Martina Halinárová, née Jašicová, also known as Schwarzbacherová from her first marriage, (born 22 April 1973 in Dolný Kubín) is a Slovak biathlete.
She won a silver medal at the 1999 Biathlon World Championships.

References
 
 

1973 births
Living people
Slovak female biathletes
Olympic biathletes of Slovakia
Biathletes at the 1994 Winter Olympics
Biathletes at the 1998 Winter Olympics
Biathletes at the 2002 Winter Olympics
Biathletes at the 2006 Winter Olympics
Biathletes at the 2010 Winter Olympics
People from Dolný Kubín
Sportspeople from the Žilina Region
Biathlon World Championships medalists
Universiade medalists in biathlon
Universiade gold medalists for Slovakia
Universiade silver medalists for Slovakia
Competitors at the 1999 Winter Universiade
Competitors at the 2001 Winter Universiade